The 2007–08 Michigan State Spartans men's basketball team represented Michigan State University in the 2007–08 NCAA Division I men's basketball season. They played their home games at Breslin Center in East Lansing, Michigan and were coached by 13th-year head coach, Tom Izzo. MSU finished the season 27–9, 12–6 to finish in fourth place in Big Ten play. They defeated Ohio State in the quarterfinals of the Big Ten tournament before losing to No. 1-seeded Wisconsin in the semifinals. They received an at-large bid to the NCAA tournament, their 11th consecutive appearance in the NCAA Tournament, as the No. 5 seed in the South region. They defeated Temple in the First Round and upset No. 4-seeded Pittsburgh to reach the Sweet Sixteen. There they lost to No. 2-ranked Memphis.

Previous season 
The Spartans finished the 2006–07 season with an overall record of 23–12, 8–8 in Big Ten play to finish in seventh place. Michigan State received a No. 9 seed in the NCAA tournament, their 10th straight trip to the Tournament, and advanced to the Second Round before losing to North Carolina.

Offseason

Recruiting class

Season summary 
The Spartans were led by senior Drew Neitzel (13.9 points and 4 rebounds per game), sophomore Raymar Morgan (14.0 points and 6.1 rebounds per game), and freshman Kalin Lucas (10.3 points and 3.8 assists per game).

Michigan State began the season ranked No. 8 in the country and participated in the CBE Classic, losing to No. 2 UCLA in the finals. They cruised through the remaining non-conference schedule with wins over No. 24 NC State, No. 20 BYU, and No. 4 Texas, finishing 12–1 and ranked No. 6 in the country.

MSU won six of their first seven Big Ten games, their lone loss an ugly 43–36 loss to Iowa on the road. They lost four of their next seven games thereafter at Penn State, at No. 19 Purdue, at No. 13 Indiana, and at No. 10 Wisconsin. They avenged their loss to Indiana by blowing them out 103–74 at the Breslin Center on March 2 after Indiana head coach Kelvin Sampson had resigned. They finished with a loss at Ohio State to finish in fourth place in the Big Ten with a record of 12–6 record and 24–7 overall. They finished the season ranked 18th in the country.

As the No. 4 seed tn the Big Ten tournament, they beat Ohio State 67–60 led by Drew Netizel's season-high 28 points. In the semifinals, MSU led by as many as 12 in the second half, they were defeated by two points by No. 8 Wisconsin. The Spartans were called for 30 fouls in the game and had four players foul out.

The Spartans received an at-large bid to the NCAA tournament to mark their 11th consecutive trip to the Tournament under Tom Izzo. As a No. 5 seed, the Spartans, led by Raymar Morgan's 15 points, beat No. 12-seeded Temple 72–61. In the Second Round, the Spartans looked to advance to the Sweet Sixteen for the seventh time in 11 years. Led by Drew Neitzel's 21 points and Kalin Lucas' 19, the Spartans overcame No. 17 Pittsburgh to move on to the Sweet Sixteen. In the Sweet Sixteen, the Spartans faced No. 2-ranked Memphis. Led by Derrick Rose's 27 points, the Tigers routed the Spartans, leading 50–20 at the half and cruising to 18-point win over MSU. Goran Suton led the Spartans with 23 points and Chris Allen had 20. It marked senior Drew Neitzel's final game for the Spartans.

Roster

Schedule and results

|-
!colspan=9 style=| Exhibition

|-
!colspan=9 style=| Non-conference regular season

|-
!colspan=9 style=|Big Ten regular season

|-
!colspan=9 style=|Big Ten tournament

|- 
!colspan=9 style=|NCAA tournament

Player statistics 

Source

Rankings

*AP does not release post-NCAA tournament rankings
Source

Awards and honors 
 Drew Neitzel – All-Big Ten First Team (Coaches), All-Big Ten Second Team (Media)
 Raymar Morgan – All-Big Ten Second Team
 Kalin Lucas – All-Big Ten Honorable Mention
 Kalin Lucas – Big Ten All-Freshman Team
 Travis Walton – Big Ten All Defensive Team

References

Michigan State Spartans men's basketball seasons
Michigan State Spartans
Michigan State
2007 in sports in Michigan
2008 in sports in Michigan